Speedaway is a game composed of  11 players on each team that combines soccer, football, and basketball.  Originally created by physical education teacher Marjorie A. Larsen. Although there is no official league, Speedaway is played in physical education classes 6th–12th grade worldwide. When players are well versed in the game, there is a constant movement of the ball between feet and hands on a huge pitch either indoor or outdoor.  Only a soccer ball is needed to play the game.
The game is fast, challenging and should make a significant contribution to any player's physical fitness.

History

Speedaway originated as a game for girls by Marjorie Larsen in California and the first rule book was published in 1950.  It is a field team game and is a combination of soccer, basketball, and field hockey, with an opportunity to run with the ball.  At its peak, Speedaway has grown in popularity throughout the United States, Canada, England, and India and is now being played by both boys and girls, with thousands of school children playing the game. Speedaway was developed out of a need for a lead-up sport to field hockey and for a game that could bring enjoyment and satisfaction to participants without a great deal of time spent in learning complicated rules and special techniques.

Gameplay

The objective of Speedaway is to take the ball from one side of the field to the other in order to score points.  Active players must implement a soft touch rule to make game play fair amongst various sizes and ages.  No rough play is permitted.

Speedaway is played on a normal American Football field shown to the right or soccer field. A full adult (size 5) soccer ball is used as the ball since its flexible to kick, dribble, and throw. If played on a soccer field, cones can be set up on designated areas to decrease the size of the field.

Teams

Each team consists of 11 players as in soccer. They are further broken down into 5 forwards, 3 midfielders, 2 defenders, and 1 goalie. The forwards job is primarily to score points, the midfielder's job is to assist the forwards as well as the defenders.  The goalie's job is to protect the goal against scoring, while the defenders protect his or her respective side as well as aiding the goalie in protecting the home side.

Rules

The game starts off with a coin toss. When a team is kicking off they must be on their side of the midline, the opposing team must be on the opposite side of the midline and outside the circle. Whichever team wins the toss will start with the ball in the middle of the field. Speedaway uses a soccer ball which may be moved down the field on the ground as in soccer, or by passing through the air similar to football. When an offensive player has possession of the ball and an opponent tags or simply touches him or her, the player must instantly drop the ball and give possession to the defending team. The team that gains possession must now kick the ball from where it was dropped. To pass the ball to a teammate, one may kick, throw, or bounce pass accordingly. When bounce passing to another teammate the ball can only hit the ground once. If the ball bounces more than one time the team with possession cannot pick the ball back up. When the ball is kicked or thrown out of bounds, the team that last touched the ball loses possession and the opposite team may throw or kick the ball into the field. Only the goalie can pick up the ball with his or her hands at any give time.  All players, beside the goalie, have to kick the ball up to themselves from the ground in order to run with the ball or make aerial passes. Each team has three time-outs they may use during the game. Any player with possession of the ball may call time-out when the ball is dead or when someone is injured. The game is broken down into four quarters and two halves each quarter being ten minutes long, making the game forty minutes. Speedaway ball is officiated by two referees, each official is responsible for each half of the field. Their responsibilities include: stopping the game after each quarter, calling fouls, and out of bounds plays. Officials must place the ball before kick offs and have the authority to remove players from play who are being too aggressive, in their own judgement.

Scoring

There are three different ways to score in Speedaway ball. The first is by a field goal worth 3 points, which is when a player kicks the ball through the opponent's two uprights. The second way a player can score is by kicking the ball into the goal below the crossbar, which is worth 2 points. The final way to score is when a player runs the ball through the opponent's goal line, similar to a Touchdown, worth 1 point.

Penalties

A team is penalized when one or more of the following occur:

1) A player with the ball is tagged by the defense and does not immediately drop the ball.

2) The ball is illegally picked up from the ground following a change of possession.

3) A player fouls an opponent, by hitting, shoving, or by performing any sort of roughness.
When any of the following penalties takes place, a free kick is placed 10 yards in front of the goal with the goalie defending. A player has one shot to score one point with a free kick.

References

Team sports